Austria competed at the World Games 2017 in Wroclaw, Poland, from 20 July 2017 to 30 July 2017.

Competitors

Fistball

Austria has qualified at the 2017 World Games in the Fistball Men Team event.

Gymnastic

Rhythmic Gymnastics
Austria has qualified at the 2017 World Games:

Women's individual event - 1 quota

Karate 

Bettina Plank competed in the women's kumite 50 kg event and Alisa Buchinger competed in the women's kumite 68 kg event.

References 

Nations at the 2017 World Games
2017 in Austrian sport
2017